For One to Love is a studio album by American jazz singer Cécile McLorin Salvant. It is the singer's third album and the follow up to WomanChild (2013).

Critical reception

The album was released to critical acclaim from publications such as the New York Times, The Guardian, and Los Angeles Times. For One to Love won Grammy Award as Best Jazz Vocal Album of 2016.

Track listing

Personnel
Adapted from AllMusic.
 Cécile McLorin Salvant – vocals
 Aaron Diehl – piano
 Paul Sikivie – double bass
 Lawrence Leathers – drums

Charts

References

2015 albums
French-language albums
Cécile McLorin Salvant albums